Moniteau County is a county located in the U.S. state of Missouri. As of the 2020 United States census, the population was 15,473. Its county seat is California. The county was organized February 14, 1845 and named for the Moniteau Creek. 'Moniteau' is a French spelling of Manitou, Algonquian for the Great Spirit.

Moniteau County is part of the Jefferson City, MO Metropolitan Statistical Area.

Geography

Adjacent counties
Cooper County (northwest)
Boone County (northeast)
Cole County (southeast)
Miller County (south)
Morgan County (southwest)

Major highways
 U.S. Route 50
 Route 5
 Route 87
 Route 179

Demographics

As of the census of 2000, there were 14,827 people, 5,259 households, and 3,728 families residing in the county.  The population density was 36 people per square mile (14/km2).  There were 5,742 housing units at an average density of 14 per square mile (5/km2).  The racial makeup of the county was 92.75% White, 3.78% Black or African American, 0.40% Native American, 0.31% Asian, 0.01% Pacific Islander, 1.48% from other races, and 1.27% from two or more races. Approximately 2.93% of the population were Hispanic or Latino of any race. 35.8% were of German, 20.5% American, 8.2% English and 7.0% Irish ancestry.

There were 5,259 households, out of which 35.30% had children under the age of 18 living with them, 58.00% were married couples living together, 8.60% had a female householder with no husband present, and 29.10% were non-families. 25.60% of all households were made up of individuals, and 13.00% had someone living alone who was 65 years of age or older.  The average household size was 2.56 and the average family size was 3.07.

In the county, the population was spread out, with 25.90% under the age of 18, 8.20% from 18 to 24, 31.10% from 25 to 44, 20.90% from 45 to 64, and 13.90% who were 65 years of age or older.  The median age was 36 years. For every 100 females, there were 113.30 males.  For every 100 females age 18 and over, there were 116.80 males.

The median income for a household in the county was $37,168, and the median income for a family was $42,487. Males had a median income of $26,807 versus $20,853 for females. The per capita income for the county was $16,609.  About 7.30% of families and 9.90% of the population were below the poverty line, including 13.10% of those under age 18 and 9.00% of those age 65 or over.

2020 Census

Education

Public schools
Clarksburg C-2 School District – Clarksburg
Clarksburg Elementary School (K-08)
High Point R-III School District – High Point
High Point Elementary School (K-08)
Jamestown C-1 School District – Jamestown
Jamestown Elementary School (PK-06)
Jamestown High School (07-12)
Moniteau County R-I School District – California
California Elementary School (PK-05)
California Middle School (06-08)
California High School (09-12)
Moniteau County R-V School District – Latham
Moniteau County Elementary School (K-08)
Tipton R-VI School District – Tipton
Tipton Elementary School (PK-06)
Tipton High School (07-12)

Private schools
California Christian Academy – California (02-07) – Nondenominational Christian
Hazel Dell School – Latham (02-09) – Mennonite
Prairie Union School – Latham (02-09) – Mennonite
South Latham School – Latham (01-08) – Mennonite
St. Andrew School – Tipton (K-09) – Roman Catholic

Public libraries
 Moniteau County @ Wood Place Library  
 Price James Memorial Library

Politics

Local
The Republican Party predominantly controls politics at the local level in Moniteau County. Republicans hold all but one of the elected positions in the county.

State

Moniteau County is split between two of the districts that elect members of the Missouri House of Representatives; both of which elected Republicans, although one seat is currently vacant.
District 50 — (Currently vacant.) Consists of the communities of California, Jamestown, and Lupus.

District 58 — David Wood (R-Versailles). Consists of the communities of Clarksburg, Fortuna, High Point, Latham, and Tipton.

All of Moniteau County is a part of Missouri's 6th District in the Missouri Senate and is currently represented by Mike Kehoe (R-Jefferson City).

Federal

All of Moniteau County is included in Missouri's 4th Congressional District and is currently represented by Vicky Hartzler (R-Harrisonville) in the U.S. House of Representatives.

Political culture

The county leans heavily Republican in presidential elections and has not voted for a Democratic candidate since 1948 - when Harry S. Truman (a Missouri native) was elected to a term in his own right.

Communities

Cities and towns

California (county seat)
Clarksburg
Jamestown
Lupus
Tipton

Unincorporated communities

 Bacon
 Cedron
 Corticelli
 Enon
 Fortuna
 High Point
 Kliever
 Latham
 McGirk
 Renfro
 Sandy Hook

See also
National Register of Historic Places listings in Moniteau County, Missouri

References

Further reading
 History of Cole, Moniteau, Morgan, Benton, Miller, Maries and Osage counties, Missouri : from the earliest time to the present, including a department devoted to the preservation of sundry personal, business, professional and the private records; besides a valuable fund of notes, original observations, etc. etc. (1889) online

External links
 Digitized 1930 Plat Book of Moniteau County  from University of Missouri Division of Special Collections, Archives, and Rare Books

 
1845 establishments in Missouri
Missouri placenames of Native American origin
Jefferson City metropolitan area
Missouri counties on the Missouri River
Populated places established in 1845